Jeon Yoon-han, known as Yoonhan (born October 14, 1983) is a South Korean pianist and singer. He was a cast member in the variety show We Got Married.

Variety show

Awards and nominations

References

External links

1983 births
Berklee College of Music alumni
Living people
South Korean jazz pianists
South Korean television personalities
Male pianists
21st-century South Korean male  singers
21st-century pianists
Male jazz musicians
South Korean male singer-songwriters